("leaf bread"; sometimes also called "snowflake bread" in English) is a traditional kind of Icelandic bread that is most often eaten in the Christmas season. Originating from northern Iceland but now eaten throughout the country, it consists of round, very thin flat cakes with a diameter of about 15 to 20 cm (6 to 8 inches), decorated with leaf-like, geometric patterns and fried briefly in hot fat or oil.

The most common pattern consists of rows of "V"-like flaps; each flap overlaps with the next one to form a braid-like design. The rows can then form a larger pattern, such as a snowflake or a letter.

Leaf bread making at home is usually a family undertaking and often an essential part of the Christmas preparations, where several generations gather and take part in the decorating.

References

External links 
 Slideshow showing how laufabrauð is prepared
 Making Laufabrauð, Icelandic Christmas Bread (audio slideshow)
 Leafing Through to Christmas, Iceland Review 46.04

Icelandic cuisine
Christmas food
Flatbreads
Icelandic breads